The Semovente da 20/70 quadruplo was an experimental self-propelled anti-aircraft weapon developed for the Italian Royal Army during World War II.

Development 

During 1942 the Royal Italian Army had ordered the development of a self-propelled anti-aircraft weapon to be used in the North African theatre of operations and  provide protection to mechanised columns, which were often the target of the Royal Air Force (RAF), without credible air defence.

To save time and materials, the hull of the M15/42 tank was used as the basis for the quadruplo: The original turret was removed and replaced with a polygonal welded open turret, containing quadruple 20 mm-Scotti Isotta Fraschini 20/70 guns, with -5° to + 90° elevation; the autocannon had been specially modified so they could use disintegrating link belt ammunition resulting in an increased rate of fire 600 rounds per minute per gun. The only other change involved the removal of the two Breda 38 machine guns in the hull, the openings for which were covered by  armour plate; the crew was reduced to three, two in the turret and one in the driver position in the hull.

Combat History 
In March 1943 it entered in service as the M15 / 42 Carro contraereo and was issued to VIII Reggimento Autieri stationed at Cecchignola in Rome, where German forces captured it. Used on active service by the Germans, by April 1945 and it was operating under the V SS-Freiwilligen-Gebirgskorps, who fought the last battle against the Red Army in Germany, in the area of Teupitz.

Another source states that two prototypes were delivered: one of these was transported to Tunisia, where it was tested under actual combat conditions, remaining there after the surrender of the 1st Italian Army and the 5th Panzer Army in May 1943.

Note

External links 	

World War II tanks of Italy
Medium tanks of Italy
M13 40
Gio. Ansaldo & C. armored vehicles
Self-propelled anti-aircraft weapons